Ray McAnally (30 March 1926 – 15 June 1989) was an Irish actor. He was the recipient of three BAFTA Awards in the late 1980s: two BAFTA Film Awards for Best Supporting Actor (for The Mission in 1986 and My Left Foot in 1989), and a BAFTA Television Award for Best Actor for A Very British Coup in 1989. In 2020, he was ranked at number 34 on The Irish Times's list of Ireland's greatest film actors.

Background
Ray McAnally was born in Buncrana, a seaside town located on the Inishowen peninsula of County Donegal, Ireland and brought up in the nearby town of Moville from the age of three. The son of a bank manager, he was educated at St Eunan's College in Letterkenny where he wrote, produced and staged a musical called Madame Screwball at the age of 16. He entered Maynooth Seminary at the age of 18 but left after a short time having decided that the priesthood was not his vocation. He joined the Abbey Theatre in 1947 where he met and married actress Ronnie Masterson.

Acting career
McAnally and Masterson later formed Old Quay Productions and presented an assortment of classic plays in the 1960s and 1970s. He made his West End theatre debut in 1962 with A Nice Bunch of Cheap Flowers and gave a well-received performance as George in Who's Afraid of Virginia Woolf?, opposite Constance Cummings, at the Piccadilly Theatre.

On television he was a familiar face, often in glossy thriller series like The Avengers, Man in a Suitcase and Strange Report. In 1968 he took the title role in Spindoe, a series charting the return to power of an English gangster, Alec Spindoe, after a five-year prison term. This was a spin-off from another series, The Fellows (1967) in which several episodes McAnally had appeared as the Spindoe character. He could render English accents very convincingly.

McAnally regularly acted in the Abbey Theatre and at Irish festivals, but in the last decade of life he achieved award-winning notice on TV and films. His performance as Cardinal Altamirano in the film The Mission (1986) earned him Evening Standard and BAFTA awards. He earned a BAFTA award nomination for his role in the BBC's A Perfect Spy and the ScreenPlay drama Scout in 1988 for the 1987 BAFTA Awards. Then in 1989 he won the 1988 BAFTA for Best Actor for his performance in A Very British Coup, a role that also brought him a Jacob's Award, and just three months before his sudden death. In the last year of his life he portrayed the father of Christy Brown (played by Daniel Day-Lewis) in the Academy Award-winning film, My Left Foot (1989).

Death
McAnally died suddenly of a heart attack on 15 June 1989, aged 63, at his home, which he shared with Irish actress Britta Smith. He remained married to actress Ronnie Masterson until his death, although they lived apart. He received a posthumous BAFTA Film Award for Best Supporting Actor for his last film in My Left Foot in 1990.

At the time of his death he was due to play 'Bull' McCabe in Jim Sheridan's film The Field. The part eventually went to Richard Harris, who received an Oscar nomination for his performance. McAnally had also been cast in the lead role of First and Last, a drama about a man who walked from Land's End to John o' Groats. Almost a third of the filming had been completed when he died but the whole play had to be refilmed, with Joss Ackland taking the role instead. 

McAnally had four children: Conor, Aonghus, Máire and Niamh. Conor is a producer, based in Texas, and Aonghus is a television and radio presenter/producer in Ireland.

Filmography 

 Professor Tim (1957) – Hugh O'Cahan
 She Didn't Say No! (1958) – Jim Power
 Sea of Sand (1958) – Sgt. Hardy
 Shake Hands with the Devil (1959) – Paddy Nolan
 The Naked Edge (1961) – Donald Heath
 Murder in Eden (1961) – Inspector Sharkey
 Billy Budd (1962) – William O'Daniel – Maintopman 
 He Who Rides a Tiger (1965) – Orphanage Superintendent
 The Looking Glass War (1970) – Undersecretary of State
 Quest for Love (1971) – Jack Kahn
 Fear Is the Key (1972) – Ruthven
 Pollyanna (1973) – John Pendleton
 Crown Court (1976, TV drama: 'Scard') – Robert E. Scard
 The Outsider (1979) – MacWhirter
 The Sleep of Death (1980) – Inspector Carmingac
 Angel (1982) – Bloom
 Cal (1984) – Cyril Dunlop
 No Surrender (1985) – Billy McRacken
 The Mission (1986) – Cardinal Altamirano
 Empire State (1987) – Frank
 The Fourth Protocol (1987) – General Yevgeny Sergeyevich Karpov
 The Sicilian (1987) – Trezza
 White Mischief (1987) – Morris
 Scout (1987) – Palmer
 A Perfect Spy (1987, TV Series) – Rick Pym
 Last of the Summer Wine (1987, Christmas Special Big Day at Dream Acres) – The Tramp
 Taffin (1988) – O'Rourke
 A Very British Coup (1988, British TV series) – The Cabinet – Harry Perkins
 Jack the Ripper (1988, TV Movie) – Sir William Gull
 High Spirits (1988) – Plunkett Senior
 My Left Foot (1989) – Mr. Brown
 Venus Peter (1989) – Grandpa
 We're No Angels (1989) – Warden (final film role)

References

External links
 
 

1926 births
1989 deaths
20th-century Irish male actors
Best Supporting Actor BAFTA Award winners
Best Actor BAFTA Award (television) winners
Burials at St. Fintan's Cemetery, Sutton
Irish male film actors
Irish male stage actors
Irish male television actors
Jacob's Award winners
Male actors from County Donegal
People educated at St Eunan's College
People from Buncrana